The compilation More Songs About Anger, Fear, Sex & Death was released in 1992 through Epitaph Records.

History and musical style 
The album was produced and compiled by Brett Gurewitz, guitarist and songwriter of Bad Religion and founder of the independent record label Epitaph in 1981. Other contributors were Donnell Cameron for engineering, since 1988 partner of Gurewitz in the Westbeach Recorders Studio in Hollywood, and Jack Endino, who produced the Songs of Coffin Break in the Reciprocal Recording Studio in Seattle in 1990.

In 1992 Epitaph Records was still a small label with few employees, so in addition to Brett Gurewitz at others Jay Bentley and Jeff Abarta. The compilation contains one or two tracks from every publication released by Epitaph at this time. Besides Bad Religion with NOFX, Pennywise, Down By Law, Dag Nasty and L7 bands are represented who became well known acts of the American punk scene.

The graphic design of the booklet by Joy Aoki was performed using the painting The Horrors of War by Peter Paul Rubens.

Title List 

*) produced by Jack Endino in the Reciprocal Studio Seattle

See also 
 Epitaph Records discography

References 

1992 albums
Epitaph Records albums
Albums produced by Jack Endino